Hubert Linard (born 26 February 1953) is a former French racing cyclist. He rode in six editions of the Tour de France between 1980 and 1985.

References

External links
 

1953 births
Living people
French male cyclists
Sportspeople from Aube
Cyclists from Grand Est